South Mountain is a 2019 American drama film written and directed by Hilary Brougher and starring Talia Balsam and Scott Cohen.

Cast
Talia Balsam
Scott Cohen
Andrus Nichols
Michael Oberholtzer
Midori Francis
Macaulee Cassady
Violet Rea
Naian Gonzalez Norvind
Guthrie Mass
Isis Masoud

Release
The film premiered at South by Southwest on March 11, 2019.

Reception
The film has  rating on Rotten Tomatoes. The site's critical consensus reads, "South Mountain sifts through the wreckage of a broken marriage, finding quietly impactful resolutions through Talia Balsam's nuanced performance."  Alex Saveliev of Film Threat gave the film a 9 out of 10.  Eric Kohn of IndieWire graded the film a B+.

Nick Schager of Variety gave the film a positive review and wrote that the film "demonstrates a realistically complex conception of stock ideas like 'vengeance,' 'moving on' and 'healing,' and Ethan Mass’s cinematography echoes the material’s dualities in its delicate interplay of light and dark."

Stephen Farber of The Hollywood Reporter also gave the film a positive review and wrote, "Painful, potent scenes from a troubled marriage."

References

External links
 
 

American drama films
2010s English-language films
2010s American films